Darreh Anar (also Romanized as Darreh Anār) is a village in Haparu Rural District, in the Central District of Bagh-e Malek County, Khuzestan Province, Iran. At the 2006 census, its population was 316, in 55 families.

References 

Populated places in Bagh-e Malek County